Pittsgrove Township is a township in Salem County, in the U.S. state of New Jersey. As of the 2020 United States census, the township's population was 8,777, a decrease of 616 (−6.6%) from the 2010 census count of 9,393, which in turn reflected an increase of 500 (+5.6%) from the 8,893 counted in the 2000 census.

Pittsgrove Township was formed by Royal charter on December 6, 1769 and was incorporated by an act of the New Jersey Legislature on February 21, 1798, as one of the initial group of 104 townships established in New Jersey. Portions of the township were taken on March 4, 1822, to form Centreville Township (which was restored in 1829 when the township was dissolved), on March 10, 1846, to form Upper Pittsgrove Township and on January 28, 1893, to form Elmer borough. The township was named for William Pitt, 1st Earl of Chatham, a supporter of the colonial cause.

Geography
According to the United States Census Bureau, the township had a total area of 45.75 square miles (118.50 km2), including 44.90 square miles (116.29 km2) of land and 0.85 square miles (2.21 km2) of water (1.87%).

Olivet (with a 2010 Census population of 1,408) is an unincorporated community and census-designated place (CDP) located within Pittsgrove Township.

Other unincorporated communities, localities and place names located partially or completely within the township include Alliance, Brotmanville, Centerton, Daretown, Greenville, Norma, Norma Station, Palatine, Parvin Lake, Rainbow Lake, Six Points, Union Grove, Upper Neck and Willow Grove.

The township borders the municipalities of Elmer Borough and Upper Pittsgrove Township in Salem County; Deerfield Township, Upper Deerfield Township and Vineland in Cumberland County and Franklin Township in Gloucester County.

Demographics

2010 census

The Census Bureau's 2006–2010 American Community Survey showed that (in 2010 inflation-adjusted dollars) median household income was $74,348 (with a margin of error of +/− $6,547) and the median family income was $83,564 (+/− $7,149). Males had a median income of $56,300 (+/− $5,678) versus $38,056 (+/− $6,727) for females. The per capita income for the borough was $28,606 (+/− $1,671). About 2.4% of families and 4.7% of the population were below the poverty line, including 5.0% of those under age 18 and 7.0% of those age 65 or over.

2000 census
As of the 2000 United States census there were 8,893 people, 3,020 households, and 2,422 families residing in the township. The racial makeup of the township was 88.14% White, 8.04% African American, 0.38% Native American, 0.58% Asian, 0.04% Pacific Islander, 1.29% from other races, and 1.52% from two or more races. Hispanic or Latino of any race were 3.41% of the population.

There were 3,020 households, out of which 38.1% had children under the age of 18 living with them, 64.9% were married couples living together, 10.7% had a female householder with no husband present, and 19.8% were non-families. 16.2% of all households were made up of individuals, and 6.2% had someone living alone who was 65 years of age or older.  The average household size was 2.90 and the average family size was 3.23.

In the township the population was spread out, with 26.7% under the age of 18, 8.0% from 18 to 24, 27.8% from 25 to 44, 26.1% from 45 to 64, and 11.4% who were 65 years of age or older.  The median age was 38 years. For every 100 females, there were 98.1 males.  For every 100 females age 18 and over, there were 93.4 males.

The median income for a household in the township was $56,687, and the median income for a family was $63,266. Males had a median income of $42,653 versus $27,173 for females. The per capita income for the township was $21,624.  About 3.5% of families and 5.0% of the population were below the poverty line, including 6.8% of those under age 18 and 4.1% of those age 65 or over.

Government

Local government
Pittsgrove Township is governed under the Township form of New Jersey municipal government, one of 141 municipalities (of the 564) statewide that use this form, the second-most commonly used form of government in the state. The Township Committee is comprised of five members, who are elected directly by the voters at-large in partisan elections to serve three-year terms of office on a staggered basis, with either one or two seats coming up for election each year as part of the November general election in a three-year cycle. At an annual reorganization meeting, the Township Committee selects one of its members to serve as Mayor and another as Deputy Mayor.

, members of the Pittsgrove Township Committee are Mayor Dr. Fiore Copare (R, term on committee ends December 31, 2023; term as mayor ends 2022), Deputy Mayor Francesca I. Spinelli (R, term on committee ends 2024; term as deputy mayor ends 2022), Eric Harz (R, 2022), William A. Schmidt (R, 2023) and Kevin Yeagle (R, 2024).

Federal, state and county representation
Pittsgrove Township is located in the 2nd Congressional District and is part of New Jersey's 3rd state legislative district.

 

Salem County is governed by a five-member Board of County Commissioners who are elected at-large to serve three-year terms of office on a staggered basis, with either one or two seats coming up for election each year. At an annual reorganization meeting held in the beginning of January, the board selects a Director and a Deputy Director from among its members. , Salem County's Commissioners (with party, residence and term-end year listed in parentheses) are 
Director Benjamin H. Laury (R, Elmer, term as commissioner ends December 31, 2024; term as director ends 2022), 
Deputy Director Gordon J. "Mickey" Ostrum, Jr. (R, Pilesgrove Township, term as commissioner ends 2024; term as deputy director ends 2022),  
R. Scott Griscom (R, Mannington Township, 2022), 
Edward A. Ramsay (R, Pittsgrove Township, 2023) and
Lee R. Ware (D, Elsinboro Township, 2022). Constitutional officers elected on a countywide basis are 
County Clerk Dale A. Cross (R, 2024),
Sheriff Charles M. Miller (R, 2024) and 
Surrogate Nicki A. Burke (D, 2023).

Politics
As of March 2011, there were a total of 5,928 registered voters in Pittsgrove Township, of which 1,618 (27.3% vs. 30.6% countywide) were registered as Democrats, 1,223 (20.6% vs. 21.0%) were registered as Republicans and 3,085 (52.0% vs. 48.4%) were registered as Unaffiliated. There were 2 voters registered as either Libertarians or Greens. Among the township's 2010 Census population, 63.1% (vs. 64.6% in Salem County) were registered to vote, including 82.3% of those ages 18 and over (vs. 84.4% countywide).

In the 2016 presidential election, Republican Donald Trump received 58% of the vote (2,508 cast), ahead of Democrat Hillary Clinton with 38.3% (1,655 votes), and other candidates with 3.6% (155 votes), among the 4,318 ballots cast in total. In the 2012 presidential election, Republican Mitt Romney received 50.2% of the vote (2,114 cast), ahead of Democrat Barack Obama with 48.6% (2,046 votes), and other candidates with 1.1% (47 votes), among the 4,229 ballots cast by the township's 6,130 registered voters (22 ballots were spoiled), for a turnout of 69.0%. In the 2008 presidential election, Democrat Barack Obama received 2,279 votes (50.0% vs. 50.4% countywide), ahead of Republican John McCain with 2,162 votes (47.5% vs. 46.6%) and other candidates with 71 votes (1.6% vs. 1.6%), among the 4,554 ballots cast by the township's 6,225 registered voters, for a turnout of 73.2% (vs. 71.8% in Salem County). In the 2004 presidential election, Republican George W. Bush received 2,233 votes (51.0% vs. 52.5% countywide), ahead of Democrat John Kerry with 2,077 votes (47.4% vs. 45.9%) and other candidates with 50 votes (1.1% vs. 1.0%), among the 4,380 ballots cast by the township's 6,022 registered voters, for a turnout of 72.7% (vs. 71.0% in the whole county).

In the 2013 gubernatorial election, Republican Chris Christie received 64.0% of the vote (1,764 cast), ahead of Democrat Barbara Buono with 33.6% (926 votes), and other candidates with 2.4% (67 votes), among the 2,908 ballots cast by the township's 6,077 registered voters (151 ballots were spoiled), for a turnout of 47.9%. In the 2009 gubernatorial election, Republican Chris Christie received 1,422 votes (46.9% vs. 46.1% countywide), ahead of Democrat Jon Corzine with 1,198 votes (39.5% vs. 39.9%), Independent Chris Daggett with 243 votes (8.0% vs. 9.7%) and other candidates with 43 votes (1.4% vs. 2.0%), among the 3,035 ballots cast by the township's 6,164 registered voters, yielding a 49.2% turnout (vs. 47.3% in the county).

Education 
Public school students from Pittsgrove Township and Elmer borough attend the Pittsgrove Township School District for kindergarten through twelfth grade as part of a full sending/receiving relationship in which the former Elmer School was integrated into the district as of 2011 and students from both Elmer and Pittsgrove Township attend school together throughout their education.

As of the 2021–22 school year, the district, comprised of five schools, had an enrollment of 1,686 students and 138.7 classroom teachers (on an FTE basis), for a student–teacher ratio of 12.2:1. Schools in the district (with 2021–22 enrollment data from the National Center for Education Statistics) are 
Norma Elementary School with 97 students in grades PreK-K, 
Elmer Elementary School with 214 students in grades 1-2, 
Olivet Elementary School with 333 students in grades 3-5, 
Pittsgrove Township Middle School with 496 students in grades 6-8 and 
A.P. Schalick High School with 486 students in grades 9-12.

Transportation

U.S. Route 40 is the most prominent highway serving Pittsgrove Township, crossing east–west along the northern edge of the township. Other significant roads within the township include Route 56, which passes through the southern part of the township, while a small portion of Route 55 passes through the eastern part of the township County highways include County Route 540, which passes east / west through the township, intersecting and briefly overlapping with County Route 553, which crosses in a north / south direction.

Public Safety 
Pittsgrove Township is protected by the New Jersey State Police. American Legion Ambulance Corps (who purchased the Elmer Ambulance Corps in 2018) and Norma/Alliance Rescue provide EMS services to the township. Centerton Fire Company, Willow Grove Fire Company, and Norma/Alliance Fire Rescue provide fire protection services for the township.

Notable people

People who were born in, residents of, or otherwise closely associated with Pittsgrove Township include:
 Stanley Brotman (1924–2014), Judge of the United States District Court for the District of New Jersey
 Jack Collins (born 1943), former Speaker of the New Jersey General Assembly
 Paul Gause (born 1986), professional basketball player for the Newcastle Eagles in the British Basketball League 
 Michael Iaconelli (born 1972), professional bass fisherman, winner of 2003 Bassmaster Classic
 Kevin Jackson (born 1978), former U.S. soccer midfielder  who spent five seasons in the USL First Division and two in the Premier Development League
 Jamarr Andre Johnson (born 1988), professional basketball player for CLS Knights Surabaya in Indonesia
 Joseph B. Perskie (1885–1957), Associate Justice of the New Jersey Supreme Court from 1933 to 1947
 Thomas Whitaker Trenchard (1863–1942), lawyer and a Justice of the New Jersey Supreme Court between 1906 and 1941, who was presiding judge in the Lindbergh kidnapping trial of Richard Hauptmann

References

External links

Pittsgrove Township website
Pittsgrove Township page on Salem County Clerk's website
Pittsgrove Township School District website

School Data for the Pittsgrove Township School District, National Center for Education Statistics

 
1769 establishments in New Jersey
Populated places established in 1769
Township form of New Jersey government
Townships in Salem County, New Jersey